Hopewell is an unincorporated community in Decatur County, Tennessee, United States. It lies at an elevation of 587 feet (179 m).

References

Unincorporated communities in Decatur County, Tennessee
Unincorporated communities in Tennessee